General elections were held in the Netherlands on 25 June 1952. The Catholic People's Party and the Labour Party both won 30 of the 100 seats in the House of Representatives. It was the first time since 1913 that the Catholic People's Party and its predecessors had not received a plurality of the vote.

The elections led to a continuation of the previous four-party government, consisting of Labour, the Catholic People's Party, People's Party for Freedom and Democracy and the Christian Historical Union. However, three months after the elections the VVD left the government and were replaced by the Anti-Revolutionary Party.

Results

References

General elections in the Netherlands
1952 elections in the Netherlands
Netherlands
June 1952 events in Europe